The Chad Cup is the top knockout tournament of the Chad football.  The winner competes in the CAF Confederation Cup the following season.

History
The first competition began in 1973.  The first part of the cup was delayed due to the Chadian Civil War that took place.  The later part up to 1988 and from 2002 to 2003 were no held due to financial problems.

Its first club into the continental competition was around the 1990s.

From 2009 to 2012, Coupe de Ligue de N'Djaména was considered the national cup. The winner of that competition enters the CAF Confederation Cup.

Winners
1973 : Gazelle FC (N'Djaména)
1974 : Gazelle FC (N'Djaména)
1975-88: unknown
1989 : Tourbillon FC (N'Djaména)
1990 : Renaissance FC (N'Djaména)
1991 : Postel 2000 FC (N'Djaména) 1-0 AS CotonTchad (N'Djaména)
1992 : Massinya (Massénya) 2-0 Boussa
1993 : Renaissance (Abéché) 3-2 Elect-Sport FC
1994 : Renaissance FC
1995 : AS CotonTchad (N'Djaména)
1996 : Renaissance FC (N'Djaména)
1997 : Gazelle FC (N'Djamena)
1998/99 : AS CotonTchad (N'Djaména)
1999/00 : Gazelle FC (N'Djaména)
2001 : Gazelle FC (N'Djaména)
2002 : not played
2003 : not played
2004 : Renaissance FC (N'Djaména) bt Espérance FC
2005 : Renaissance FC (N'Djaména) bt Lion Blessé FC
2006 : Renaissance FC (N'Djaména)
2007 : Renaissance FC (N'Djaména)
2008 : Tourbillon FC 4-1 Renaissance FC
2009 : AS CotonTchad (N'Djaména) 3-0 ASBNF (Koumra)
2010 : Tourbillon FC
2011 : Foullah Edifice FC (N'Djamena)
2012 : Gazelle FC (N'Djaména)
2013 : Aslad Moundou 1-1 Renaissance FC (N'Djaména) [3-1 pen]
2014/2015: Renaissance FC (N/Djaména)

Coupe de Ligue de N'Djaména
2009 : AS CotonTchad 4-3 (pen) Postel 2000 FC
2010 : Foullah Edifice 2-1 (aet) Renaissance FC
2011 : Renaissance FC 2-1 (aet) Foullah Edifice
2012 : Elect-Sport FC 1-1 (4-3 pen.) Renaissance FC
2013 : Renaissance FC 1-0 Foullah Edifice
2014 : Elect-Sport FC (Final between Elect-Sport FC and Renaissance FC)

References

External links
RSSSF.com

Football competitions in Chad
National association football cups